An election was held to Swale Borough Council in England as part of the United Kingdom local elections on 7 May 2015. All 47 seats were up for election under new ward boundaries.

The party results were as follows: Conservatives: 32, UKIP: 9, Labour: 4, and Independents: 2.

Ward Results

By-elections between 2015 and 2019

Milton Regis
A by-election was held in Milton Regis on 3 August 2017 after the death of UKIP councillor Katy Coleman. The seat was gained for Labour by former councillor Tony Winckless with a majority of 318 votes over Conservative candidate Kane Roy Blackwell.

Sheppey East

A by-election was held in Sheppey East on 3 May 2018 after the resignation of Conservative councillor Lesley Ingham. The seat was held for the Conservatives by Lynd Ernest Taylor with a majority of 184 votes over Labour candidate Gill Smith.

Changes between 2015 and 2019 
UKIP councillor Katy Coleman (Milton Regis) died suddenly on 30 May 2017. At the consequent by-election on 3 August 2017 Labour gained the seat. New councillor Tony Winckless.

Conservative councillor Lesley Ingham (Sheppey East) resigned her seat in March 2018. At the consequent by-election on 3 May 2018 the Conservatives held the seat. New councillor Lynd Taylor.

In April 2018, all 8 remaining UKIP councillors chose to sit as 'The Swale Group'. This was reduced by one on the 7 April 2019 when former UKIP councillor Padmini Nissanga (Sheppey East) was expelled from The Swale Group following accusations of racism and now sits as an Independent

See also 
 Swale Borough Council elections

References

2015 English local elections
May 2015 events in the United Kingdom
2015
2010s in Kent